Merck headquarters may refer to
The headquarters of Merck Group in Darmstadt, Germany
The headquarters of Merck & Co. in Kenilworth, New Jersey, United States 
Merck Headquarters Building, the former headquarters of Merck & Co. in Whitehouse Station, New Jersey, United States